Athanasios Diakos (before 1958: Άνω Μουσουνίτσα - Ano Mousounitsa) is a small village in the municipal unit of Kallieis, Phocis, Greece. It was named after the Greek national hero Athanasios Diakos. He may have been born there as well, but this is disputed by the village Artotina. The village is situated on the eastern slope of the Vardousia mountains, above the upper valley of the river Mornos, at about 1000 m elevation. In 2011 its population was 518. It is the largest village in the municipal unit. It is 2 km northwest of Mousounitsa, 12 km east of Artotina and 26 km northwest of Amfissa.

Population

See also
 List of settlements in Phocis

References

External links
 Athansios Diakos at the GTP Travel Pages

Populated places in Phocis